Manussiha, is a Burmese half-man half-lion mythical creature believed to be created by Buddhist missionary monks to protect a new-born royal baby from being devoured by rakshasis (ogresses) from the sea. Its statues are usually found guarding the four corners of a pagoda. It has a human head and torso and lion hindquarters. Thus, it can be called a Burmese sphinx.
Notably, Manussiha is the symbol in the seal of Shwedagon Pagoda and the patch badge of Shwe Dagon Pagoda Security.

Etymology

Manussīha(မနုဿီဟ) is a combination of two Pali words; Manussa(မနုဿ) meaning "human" and Sīha(သီဟ) meaning "lion". Thus, it can be literally translated as "Man-lion".

The Myanmar-English Dictionary, published by the Myanmar Language Commission, defined မနုဿီဟ as: မနုဿီဟ
fabulous creature with a man's torso and a lion's hindquarters, depicted in a squatting posture on forked haunches 
[Pali မနုဿ + သီဟ]

History
The most famous version of history of Manussīha is from Sāsanālaṅkāya Treatises (သာသနာလင်္ကာရစာတမ်း). According to that treatises, Manussīha, first appeared in 235 BE (309 BCE), is not a real creature, but a statue in order to frighten the ogres.

In 235th year after Parinibbāna of Lord Buddha, the Buddhist missionary of five mathērs (senior monks) led by Soṇa and Uttara arrived at Sadhuim of Suvaṇṇabhūmi where the king Sirīmāsoka was reigning at that time. As the city is near the sea, the bīlūḥmas (belumas or ogresses) living in the sea had been coming to eat the babies from the royal households. On the same day when the missionaries arrived, the queen had just born a baby and the 500 bīlūḥmas were coming. The people were seriously frightened by seeing these. The missionary monks then used their Abhiññā Iddhi power to create 1000 frightening images, with a human head and two hindquarters of lions (thus called as Manussīha (Man-lion)), to surround the bīlūḥmas who frightened and ran away after that. The monks then recite the Paritta protections to prevent returning of bīlūḥs and other bad creatures. All the people converted to Buddhism, and 3500 men including 1500 princes were willingly ordained as monks. After that, Manussīha figures drawn on palm leaves were put as amulets on children's head to protect them from bad creatures. A rock Mannusīha statue was erected on the mountain northeast of Sadhuim (modern day Thaton). 

There are different versions of that history, only different in stating the name and location of the capital city of Suvaṇṇabhūmi.
Sadhuim is the short form of Suddhammapura. Some sources say the capital city is Suddhammavati. Some other authoritative sources say that its name was Taikkala ( from Golamatti in Pali, through Mon-Tuik gala). The authoritative sources states that half of the city was located on top of Mount Kelasa while the rest was on the adjoining plain.

Gallery

Notes

References

Burmese legendary creatures
Burmese culture
Buddhist legendary creatures
Mythological lions